The 2012 FIA European Touring Car Cup is the eighth running of the FIA European Touring Car Cup. It will consist of four events in Italy, Slovakia and Austria. The events will consist of two races run over a distance of approximately  each. For the first time, five FIA categories will be eligible to enter: Super 2000, Super 1600, Super Production, SEAT León Supercopa and Renault Clio Cup.

Teams and drivers

Race calendar and results

Notes
 — Fernando Monje originally qualified on pole position, but he received a 10-place grid penalty for a collision with Urs Sonderegger in Slovakia.

Championship standings

Super 2000/1600

Super Production/Single-makes Trophy

References

External links

European Touring Car Cup
European Touring Car Cup
2012 in European sport